Phyllonorycter agassizi is a moth of the family Gracillariidae. It is found in Kenya in savannah areas.

The length of the forewings is 3.3 mm. The forewing  ground colour is fuscous brown, with darker shading towards the apical part. The hindwings are silvery shiny pale beige. Adults are on wing in late December.

Etymology
The species is named after the collector of the holotype, David J. L. Agassiz, a microlepidopterist.

References

Endemic moths of Kenya
Moths described in 2012
agassizi
Moths of Africa

Taxa named by Jurate de Prins